Angela Rosemary Crow (13 December 1935 – 3 March 2022) was an English television actress, best known for her appearance in the early days of British soap opera Coronation Street, as factory worker Doreen Lostock, between 1961 and 1963.

Early life
Crow trained at RADA, and following her graduation in 1954, toured in companies appearing in provincial theatres, as well as the Edinburgh Festival.

Career

Early career
Crow's first television appearance was in Rheingold Theatre, in 1956. She also appeared in other television programmes such as Hancock's Half Hour, BBC Sunday Night Theatre and a 1960 adaption of the Charles Dickens novel, Barnaby Rudge.

Coronation Street
In 1960, Crow was cast as ditzy factory worker Doreen Lostock in the newly-commissioned ITV soap opera, Coronation Street. Crow appeared for two years from 1961, but was absent for most of 1962 due to the Equity Actor's Strike. The character reappeared in June of that year, before departing for good in October. During her tenure, her character had a relationship with Billy Walker (Ken Farrington), son of popular long-standing character Annie (Doris Speed).

The character of Doreen had a particularly good friendship with fellow factory worker Sheila Birtles (Eileen Mayers). This friendship proved popular with the public, and served as a basis for the friendships of future young characters.

Forty-nine years later, Crow appeared in the 2012 documentary The Corrie Years to discuss her experience on the show.

Later career
After leaving Coronation Street, Crow has appeared in various popular television shows. One of which was the Street spin-off, Pardon the Expression, in which Crow played shop assistant Miss Clapper. Ironically, the character worked under Arthur Lowe's character Leonard Swindley, who had been the boss of Crow's character when she was on Coronation Street.

Other appearances include Dixon of Dock Green, Last of the Summer Wine, Love Thy Neighbour, Grange Hill and Heartbeat.

Selected filmography

References

External links
 

1935 births
2022 deaths
Actresses from Yorkshire
English soap opera actresses
English television actresses
20th-century English actresses
21st-century English actresses
RADA